"Diversity Day" is the second episode of the first season of the American comedy television series The Office. Written by B. J. Novak and directed by Ken Kwapis, it first aired in the United States on March 29, 2005, on NBC. The episode guest-stars Office consulting producer Larry Wilmore as Mr. Brown.

In this episode, Michael's (Steve Carell) controversial imitation of a Chris Rock routine forces the staff to undergo a racial diversity seminar. A consultant (Larry Wilmore) arrives to teach the staff about tolerance and diversity, but Michael insists on imparting his own knowledge—aggravating both the consultant and the entire office staff—and creates his own diversity seminar. He eventually assigns each staff member an index card with a different race on it, causing tempers to slowly simmer until they finally snap. Meanwhile, Jim struggles to keep hold of a lucrative contract extension, but Dwight makes the sale for himself.

"Diversity Day" was the first episode of The Office to feature original writing, as the pilot episode ("Pilot") contained many jokes from the British series pilot. Wilmore, a writer for the show, had to formally audition with other actors because of stipulations with the Screen Actors Guild. The episode received a 2.7/6 in the Nielsen ratings among people aged 18–49 and garnered 6.0 million viewers overall, losing almost half of its audience from the previous week. Despite this setback, the episode received positive reviews from television critics.

Plot
In answer to Michael’s (Steve Carell) apparently constant recitation of Chris Rock's "Niggas vs. Black People" routine, the corporate offices of Dunder Mifflin send a representative (Larry Wilmore) from Diversity Today to hold a meeting regarding diversity training. Michael finds it insulting and, as a response, holds his own diversity meeting. He shows a brief video that addresses nothing of significance, claims that his heritage is "two-fifteenths Native American," and instructs everyone to wear index cards with a certain race on it and to treat others however they might treat people of those races. When he delivers a racist impression of an Indian person to Kelly (Mindy Kaling) (who is in fact not wearing a card, having missed the activity due to a meeting), she takes offense and slaps him.

Meanwhile, Jim (John Krasinski) desperately tries to re-up an annual sale that will amount to a quarter of his yearly commission, but he is ultimately undercut by Dwight (Rainn Wilson). However, during the end of the diversity meeting Pam (Jenna Fischer) dozes on his shoulder, leading Jim to conclude that it was nevertheless "not a bad day".

Production

Larry Wilmore, who plays the sensitivity trainer Mr. Brown, is a writer for the show. At the table-read for this episode, they had not cast the part yet and Daniels had Wilmore read for the role to fill in. After the read, producer Greg Daniels thought he was perfect for the role. However, because of stipulations with the Screen Actors Guild, producers still had to have Wilmore formally audition with other actors for the role. Daniels was also not sure where to use Mindy Kaling on-screen in the series until the point came in this episode's script when Michael needed to be slapped by a minority. Her character in this episode, however, is far from the bubbly, chatty character that Kelly later becomes.
The second episode of the series was the first to feature predominantly original writing, as the pilot episode contained many jokes from the British series pilot. During one of Michael's impersonations, a racial expletive spoken by Michael had to be censored by the producers for NBC. Daniels was terrified that the scene would leak unedited, so he personally oversaw the censoring of the master copy.

The scene during which Pam rests her head on Jim's shoulder after Dwight has stolen his sale and Jim smiles and says "not a bad day after all" came about when Greg Daniels spoke to the writers about wanting to have small, happy interactions between Jim and Pam and mentioned the head-on-shoulder idea, which B. J. Novak immediately wrote into his script. Paul Lieberstein did not want to appear in the episode and did so assuming it would be a one-time event, but Kevin Reilly was impressed by his work and said the show should use him more, leading to the expansion of Paul's work as Toby Flenderson. Two scenes that were cut involved Michael Scott responding to Mr. Brown's "HERO" acronym by creating one that sounded good until everyone noticed the words created the acronym of "INCEST", and Michael responded to Mr. Brown's nixing of that idea by pointing out the links between incest and racism in some states, while another had Jim replacing Dwight's "Asian" headband with "Dwight" and then having the other co-workers complain to a clueless Dwight about how annoying his behavior was.

Web release

NBC webcast this episode on March 16, 2005, on MySpace to promote the show's then-upcoming premiere. This was  NBC's first-ever online debut of a complete episode of a network series, and also included a trimmed-down webisode version of the episode for on-demand viewing on MySpace the following day. Greg Daniels later noted in an interview with Uproxx that cutting it to the required 12 minutes "was almost impossible" and that he had already "really sweated" during the process of getting the episode down to the 22 minutes for broadcast.

Reception

Ratings
"Diversity Day" premiered on NBC on March 29, 2005. While the pilot episode garnered over eleven million viewers, the second episode lost over half its viewing audience from the previous episode. The episode received a 2.7/6 in the Nielsen ratings among people aged 18–49, meaning that 2.7 percent of all 18- to 49-year-olds viewed the episode and six percent of all 18- to 49-year-olds watching TV viewed it. The episode garnered 6.0 million viewers overall. The episode, airing after Scrubs, retained 90% of its lead-in 18–49 audience. In addition, "Diversity Day", along with the other first-season episodes of The Office, helped NBC score its highest-rated Tuesday night slot since February 1, 2005.

Reviews
Contrary to the lukewarm response to the pilot, "Diversity Day" earned positive reviews from television critics. Entertainment Weekly gave the episode positive reviews, stating that: "Think of the toss-off racism of the original, plopped into a PC-gone-wrong showcase that might be entitled The Accidental Bigot. As when the African-American diversity trainer introduces himself as Mr. Brown, and Scott assures him, 'I will not call you that.'" Ricky Gervais (the lead in the British series) stated that in comparison to the British version, "[i]t is as good. I love the fact that, apart from the first one, the scripts are all original. You've gone back to the blueprint of what the characters are and you've started from there, as opposed to copying anything." Rolling Stone magazine named the scene wherein Michael shows the office his diversity video the third greatest Moment from The Office. The article particularly praised Michael's line: "Abraham Lincoln once said, 'If you are a racist, I will attack you with the North.

Erik Adams of The A.V. Club awarded the episode a "B+" and felt that, as the show lost viewers in the first season, the stories got better, and that "Diversity Day" is an excellent example of this "unfortunate trend". He noted that the episode "would go on to be one of the series’ defining episodes, an installment that put a more hopeful spin on the original Offices views on accepting the disparity between our dreams and our realities." However, Adams noted that Carell's character was still too aggressive for Michael Scott to be completely lovable, and that the second season episode "Sexual Harassment" would serve as "a gentler spiritual sequel" to this episode, featuring a similar premise, but with a softened Michael Scott. For his work on this episode, B. J. Novak was nominated for a Writers Guild of America Award for Best Screenplay – Episodic Comedy.

On August 22, 2021, the channel Comedy Central removed the episode from its reruns of the show. However it remains in rotation on Freeform and is still available to stream on Peacock, NBCUniversal's streaming service

References

External links
"Diversity Day" at NBC.com

Race and ethnicity in television
The Office (American season 1) episodes

fr:La Journée de la diversité